The Embassy of Russia in Dublin is the diplomatic mission of the Russian Federation to the Republic of Ireland.

Location
The original house was about a century old in 2022.

History

Soviet era
In 1973 the government of the Republic of Ireland decided to open diplomatic relations with the Soviet Union despite the objections of then Defence Minister Paddy Donegan, who was concerned that many embassy staff could be spies.

1983 expulsions
In 1983 three Soviet diplomats were expelled from Ireland. Taoiseach Garret FitzGerald asked Minister of State at the Department of Foreign Affairs Jim O'Keeffe to tell the three diplomats - Guennadi Saline (First secretary of the Soviet Embassy in Dublin), Viktor Lipassov and his wife Evdokia - that they had to leave. Speculation in Irish media at the time was that it was connected to the IRA, but years later it was revealed that it concerned attempts to gather information on United States military via a double agent met in the Stillorgan Shopping Center.

Post Soviet era

Planned expansion
In 2015 planning permission had been granted by Dún Laoghaire–Rathdown County Council to expand the Russian embassy.

In March 2020 then Minister for Housing Eoghan Murphy was summoned to a top secret meeting with senior defence and security officials. Closer examination of the plans had caused concern and the government had recently passed legislation to allow blocking of planning permission on national security grounds. On 4 March 2020 Eoghan Murphy signed an order to revoke part of the planning permission granted to the embassy.

Allegations of intelligence gathering
Irish security sources have stated that they believe the GRU and SVR operate out of the embassy.

2022 invasion of Ukraine

After the Russian government invaded Ukraine in February 2022, hundreds of people protested outside the embassy.

On 7 March 2022 a truck was driven into the gates of the embassy. A man was arrested.

2022 expulsions
In March 2022 Micheál Martin announced that four senior officials of the embassy were to be expelled because "their activities are not in accordance with the international standards of diplomatic behaviour". They would be considered persona non grata, have their credentials withdrawn and be given a set number of days to leave. They were expelled under the 1961 Vienna Convention. The Gardaí believed they were part of the GRU. The ambassador was not one of those expelled.

See also
Ireland–Russia relations
List of ambassadors of Russia to Ireland

References

Diplomatic missions in Dublin (city)
Diplomatic missions of Russia
Ireland–Russia relations